Arctoparmelia centrifuga or the concentric ring lichen is a species of ring lichen belonging to the family Parmeliaceae.

Synonym:
 Lichen centrifugus L. (= basionym)

References

Lichen species
Parmeliaceae
Taxa named by Carl Linnaeus